Yawkasakrom is a village in the Amansie South District in the Ashanti Region of Ghana. The village is known for its gold and shares boundary with Bonsaaso.

It has the Yawkasakrom D/A Primary School, a six-unit block donated by the Millennium Project. In 2014, a 3-room teachers quarters was donated to the people of Yawkasakrom by Awudra Ventures.

References 

Populated places in the Ashanti Region
Villages in Ghana